The Singles Collect is a compilation album by Canadian electro-industrial band Skinny Puppy, released in 1999. The release serves as a collection of singles along with a few assorted promotional singles and alternate mixes. The compilation represents all of the singles released by Nettwerk before the band's move to American Recordings and subsequent break-up.

On the rear cover, Track 8 is mistakenly titled "Spamsmolytic" instead of "Spasmolytic".

Track listing

Personnel
Skinny Puppy
 Nivek Ogre – vocals
 cEvin Key – synthesizers, guitars, bass guitars, drums
 Dwayne Goettel – synthesizers, sampling

Additional personnel
Dale Plevin – fretless bass on 1, 8, 10
Tom Ellard – tapes, samples on 5
Wilhelm Schroeder – backing voice on 6, bass synth on 15
Alien Jourgensen – additional guitar on 9
Rave – live sound, guitar on 4, 8, 12

References

1999 compilation albums
Skinny Puppy compilation albums
Nettwerk Records compilation albums